In Greek mythology, Hierax is the name of the following figures:

 Hierax, a just and honest man from the land of Mariandyni who honoured Demeter greatly and received plentiful harvest from her. When a tribe neglected Poseidon, he destroyed Demeter's crops, so Hierax sent them barley, wheat and other food. For this Poseidon changed him into a hawk, as hated by mankind as Hierax had been loved.
 Hierax, a mortal man who told on Hermes as he tried to sneak in and steal the metamorphosed Argive princess Io from Argus (Io's guardman), forcing Hermes to kill him instead.

Notes

References 
 Antoninus Liberalis, The Metamorphoses of Antoninus Liberalis translated by Francis Celoria (Routledge 1992). Online version at the Topos Text Project.
 Apollodorus, Apollodorus, The Library, with an English Translation by Sir James George Frazer, F.B.A., F.R.S. in 2 Volumes. Cambridge, MA, Harvard University Press; London, William Heinemann Ltd. 1921. Online version at the Perseus Digital Library.

Deeds of Poseidon
Deeds of Demeter
Deeds of Hermes
Anatolian characters in Greek mythology
Metamorphoses into birds in Greek mythology